Linda Rae Jurgens is an American television and  film actress.

Biography

Jurgens was part of the cast of Top Gun (1986), in which she played the wife of Naval aviator Mike 'Viper' Metcalf played by Tom Skerritt.

Filmography

References

External links

Year of birth missing (living people)
Living people
American television actresses
American film actresses
20th-century American actresses
21st-century American women